Schultz Lake is a lake in St. Louis County, in the U.S. state of Minnesota.

Schultz Lake bears the name of an early settler.

See also
List of lakes in Minnesota

References

Lakes of Minnesota
Lakes of St. Louis County, Minnesota